MFC Spartak Varna is a Bulgarian beach soccer team based in Varna. The club was founded in 2008. Spartak have won a 7 Bulgarian Championship titles.

Honours
Bulgarian Championship
 Winners (10): 2008, 2011, 2012, 2013, 2016, 2017, 2018, 2019, 2020, 2021
 Runners-up (4): 2009, 2010, 2014, 2015

Varna International Beach Soccer Cup
 Winners: 2021, 2017
 3rd place: 2018
 Runners-up: 2019

Beach Soccer International Cup West Dewa
 Runners-up: 2017

Euro Winners Cup
 Group stage: 2014
 Group stage: 2017
 12th place: 2018
 Round of 32: 2019
 8th place: 2021

Current squad
As of 22 July 2021

References

External links
 Official website
 Official facebook page

Beach soccer clubs
Sports teams in Bulgaria
Sport in Varna, Bulgaria